Gunilla Ahren is a Swedish Paralympic alpine skier. She represented Sweden in Paralympic Alpine skiing at the  1984 Paralympic Winter Games, and 1988 Paralympic Winter Games. She won of six medals: four golds, one silver and one bronze.

Career 
She competed at the 1984 Winter Paralympics in Innsbruck in the LW6 / 8 category. Ahren won four gold medals: in the slalom (achieved time 1:16.04), in the giant slalom (with a time of 1:28.68 ), downhill (race ended in 1:09.20), and alpine super combined.

She competed 1988 Winter Paralympics. She won silver in the special slalom race (gold for Martina Altenberger in 1: 15.63 and bronze for Eszbieta Dadok in 1: 37.46), and bronze in downhill in 1:17.64 (on the podium in front of her, Martina Altenberger with 1: 13.87, and Nancy Gustafson in 1: 14.51.

She competed at the 1990 World disabled ski championships.

References 

Living people
Paralympic alpine skiers of Sweden
Swedish female alpine skiers
Alpine skiers at the 1984 Winter Paralympics
Alpine skiers at the 1988 Winter Paralympics
Medalists at the 1984 Winter Paralympics
Medalists at the 1988 Winter Paralympics
Paralympic gold medalists for Sweden
Paralympic silver medalists for Sweden
Paralympic bronze medalists for Sweden
20th-century Swedish women
Year of birth missing (living people)